Hartnett may refer to:

People
Angela Hartnett (b. 1969), British chef
Gabby Hartnett (1900–1972), American baseball player and manager
Jimmy Hartnett (1927–1988), Irish former professional footballer
Josh Hartnett (b. 1978), American actor 
Josie Hartnett (1927–2005), Irish sportsperson
Kevin Hartnett (b. 1984), Irish sportsperson
Laurence Hartnett (1898–1986), engineer who made several important contributions to the Australian automotive industry
Michael Hartnett (1941-1999), an Irish poet
P. P. Hartnett, (b. 1958), Irish writer and photographer
Sonya Hartnett (b. 1938), Australian author
Thomas F. Hartnett (b. 1941), U.S. Representative from South Carolina
Will Ford Hartnett (b. 1956), former member of the Texas House of Representatives from Dallas County
William E. Hartnett (1919-2002), American politician and lawyer
William J. Hartnett (1932-2016), American politician and educator

Other uses
Hartnett (car), an automobile produced in Australia from 1951 to 1955
 Hartnett House, predecessor to Bella Terra Publishing

See also
 Harnett (disambiguation)